Maurice Godin (born 21 October 1932 in Montreal, Quebec) was a member of the House of Commons of Canada from 1993 to 2000. He is a manager by career.

He was elected in the Châteauguay electoral district under the Bloc Québécois party in the 1993 and 1997 federal elections, thus serving in the 35th and 36th Canadian Parliaments. Godin did not seek a third term in Parliament and left Canadian politics in 2000.

Electoral record

References
 

1932 births
Bloc Québécois MPs
Living people
Members of the House of Commons of Canada from Quebec
Politicians from Montreal